Choiceland is a town located in Saskatchewan, Canada. Choiceland is located an hour or so from Prince Albert, a larger Saskatchewan city.

Choiceland is home to William Mason Public School, which offers schooling for grades kindergarten through 12.

The Torch River Railway is based in Choiceland.

Demographics 

Climate

See also 
 List of communities in Saskatchewan
 List of towns in Saskatchewan

References

External links

Towns in Saskatchewan
Torch River No. 488, Saskatchewan